Edwardsiphyton ("Edwards' plant") is a genus of fossil from the Middle Ordovician (Darriwilian, 460 million years old) Douglas Lake Member of the Lenoir Limestone from Douglas Dam Tennessee The genus was named in honor of Dianne Edwards, and the epithet refers to the shape of the capsules.

Description
Edwardisphyton was considered as moss fossil by Gregory Retallack. It has narrow acutely pointed leaves and recurved capsules. Spores are small and verrucate.

Biological affinities
Edwardsiphyton is similar to modern mosses of the family Pottiaceae such as Dicranum. The interpretation of this fossil as a harsh moss has been doubted in some quarters  but accepted in others.

References

Fossils of Tennessee
Fossil record of plants
Ordovician plants
Pottiales
Prehistoric plant genera
Moss genera